The following is the list of awards and nominations received by Cara Delevingne.

British Fashion Awards

British Independent Film Awards

British LGBT Awards

CinemaCon Awards

Elle Style Awards

Melhores do Ano Atrevida

People's Choice Awards

Teen Choice Awards

Young Hollywood Awards

References

Delevingne